Morden Park is a  public park and Site of Borough Importance for Nature Conservation, Grade 1, in the district of Morden Park in the London Borough of Merton. Of this,  is a Local Nature Reserve. It is owned and managed by Merton Council. It includes Morden Park House (Registry Office).

Landscape
The site includes the Morden Park mound, a Scheduled Ancient Monument, and Pyl Brook runs through.

Biodiversity
Some oaks are over 300 years old, and bird species include green and great spotted woodpeckers, coal tits and spotted flycatchers. Grassland areas have wildflowers and a range of butterflies.

Morden Park House (register office)
The park remains the grounds of the eighteenth-century Morden Park House, in the initial category of listed building Grade II which is used as a registry office, specialising in weddings, having also reception event-hire space for those married in religious or other venues. In 1945 the house and park were purchased by Merton and Morden Urban District Council. 

Access is from Epsom Road, Morden Lane and London Road.

Abandoned formal pitches proposal
In 2008, Merton Council proposed allowing Goals Soccer Centres to build seventeen football pitches of varying types, many of them floodlit, along with a clubhouse with a licensed bar on part of the park. Following public objections, Merton Council abandoned this plan the next year.

References

Parks and open spaces in the London Borough of Merton
Local nature reserves in Greater London
Nature reserves in the London Borough of Merton
Morden